John Ferguson (born 19 March 1949) is  a former Australian rules footballer who played with Richmond in the Victorian Football League (VFL).

Notes

External links 		
		
		
		
		
		

1949 births
Living people
Australian rules footballers from Victoria (Australia)		
Richmond Football Club players